Tanko may refer to
Tankō, a type of Japanese armor
Tankō Bushi, a Japanese folk song
Tanko (name)
Tanko (vehicle), Italian term for folk armored vehicles used by Venetian separatists and other groups